Berggren is a Swedish surname. Notable people with the surname include:

Arne Berggren, Norwegian author and scriptwright
Dick Berggren, American motorsports announcer and magazine editor
Emelie Berggren (born 1982), Swedish ice hockey player
Evy Berggren, Swedish gymnast and Olympic champion
Gunnar Berggren (1908–1983), Swedish boxer
Hans Berggren, Swedish footballer 
Inger Berggren, Swedish singer
Jenny Berggren (born 1972), Swedish singer
Jonas Berggren (born 1967), Swedish singer
Jonatan Berggren (born 2000), Swedish ice hockey player
Linn Berggren (born 1970), Swedish singer 
Liza Berggren (born 1986), Swedish fashion model and former dancer
Niklas Berggren (born 1966), Swedish curler
Peter Berggren, former Swedish Olympic swimmer
Tom Berggren, (born 1942), Swedish curler
Sven Berggren (1837–1917), Swedish botanist, explorer and university professor 
Thommy Berggren, Swedish actor
Tobias Berggren (born 1940), Swedish poet
Tommy Berggren (1950–2012), Swedish football player
Wes Berggren (1971–1999), American musician

See also
 Bergren

Swedish-language surnames